Gigabhai Bhavubhai Gohil was an Indian politician. He was elected to the Lok Sabha, the lower house of the Parliament of India from Bhavnagar in Gujarat as a member of the Indian National Congress. Gohil belonged to Gohil Koli community of Gujarat. Gigabhai Gohil started his political career as Sarpanch of Khari village in Mahuva taluka and later became the president of Bhavnagar district panchayat, MLA and Minister of State.

Gigabhai Gohil took active part in the Quit India Movement in 1942. Gohil also fought against the Nawab Muhammad Mahabat Khan III of Junagad State to merge it in India and joined the Arzi Hukumat under the banner of Indian National Congress in 1947.

Social activities 
He worked for uplift of weaker sections of the society; worked for the famine affected people in Bhavnagar District, 1972.

References

External links
 Official biographical sketch in Parliament of India website

Koli people
India MPs 1980–1984
India MPs 1984–1989
Lok Sabha members from Gujarat
Year of birth missing
People from Bhavnagar
2020 deaths
Indian National Congress politicians from Gujarat